Laminin subunit alpha-1 is a protein that in humans is encoded by the LAMA1 gene.

Interactions
Laminin, alpha 1 has been shown to interact with FBLN2.

Role in pathology
Mutations of the LAMA1 gene cause the Poretti–Boltshauser syndrome.

References

Further reading

Laminins